Denys Strekalin (born 31 March 1999) is a Ukrainian-born pair skater who competes for France. With his former skating partner, Cléo Hamon, he is a two-time French national champion (2020, 2021), 2018 Volvo Open Cup champion, and has competed in the final segment at three World Junior Championships (2017–2019).

Career

In Ukraine 
Strekalin began learning to skate in 2006. Competing in men's singles, he placed seventh at the Ukrainian Junior Championships in 2013 and 2015. He also trained in pair skating with Sofiia Nesterova.

Partnership with Hamon

Early seasons
In August 2016, Strekhalin teamed up with Cleo Hamon to compete for France in pairs. Coached by Mehdi Bouzzine in Courbevoie, they made their international debut in February 2017, placing seventh in junior pairs at the Bavarian Open. In March, they placed fourteenth at the 2017 World Junior Championships in Taipei, Taiwan.

In September 2017, Hamon/Strekalin debuted on the ISU Junior Grand Prix (JGP) series, placing eighth in Riga, Latvia. In December, appearing on the senior level, they won silver at the French Championships, behind Lola Esbrat / Andrei Novoselov. In March, they finished eleventh at the 2018 World Junior Championships in Sofia, Bulgaria.

Competing in the 2018 JGP series, Hamon/Strekalin placed sixth in Linz, Austria, and fifth in Ostrava, Czech Republic. Making their senior international debut, the pair took gold at the Volvo Open Cup in November 2018. In March 2019, they finished ninth at the 2019 World Junior Championships in Zagreb, Croatia.

2019–20 season
After placing eighth at the 2019 JGP United States, Hamon/Streklain debuted on the senior Challenger series with a seventh-place finish at the 2019 CS Finlandia Trophy.  They would go on to place tenth at the 2019 CS Warsaw Cup and ninth at their first European Championships. Hamon/Strekalin also won the French senior national title for the first time, due to the absence of James/Cipres from the competition season.  They finished the season at the 2020 World Junior Championships, where they placed fifth. Hamon/Strekalin were scheduled to participate in the 2020 World Championships in Montreal, which would have been their senior World debut, but these were canceled due to the COVID-19 pandemic.

2020–21 season
With the pandemic ongoing, Hamon/Strekalin began the new season at the 2020 CS Nebelhorn Trophy, where only pairs training in Europe competed. They were fourth after the short program, and after the top-ranked Hase/Seegert withdrew, they placed third in the free and won the bronze medal.

Hamon/Strekalin were scheduled to make their Grand Prix debut at the 2020 Internationaux de France, but the event was cancelled due to the pandemic.

In February, they won their second straight National title. Later that month, they competed at the International Challenge Cup, placing fifth. On March 1, they were named to the team for the 2021 World Championships. They placed twentieth in their World Championship debut. Hamon/Strekalin finished the season at the 2021 World Team Trophy, where they finished fifth in both segments, and Team France finished in fifth place overall.

2021–22 season
Hamon/Strekalin began the season at the 2021 Lombardia Trophy, where they finished in fourth place.

They were originally scheduled to compete at the Nebelhorn Trophy, where the final Olympics spots would be decided, but were later replaced by Coline Keriven / Noël-Antoine Pierre. It was later announced that Hamon would be taking a break from figure skating due to health issues from burnout, and that had been the reason for them being replaced at the Nebelhorn Trophy.

Partnership with Hamon

2022–23 season 
On January 31, 2022, Strekalin announced that he had formed a new partnership with former singles skater Océane Piegad. They made their competitive debut at the 2022 CS Nebelhorn Trophy, where they finished in eleventh place, and were then invited to make their Grand Prix debut at the 2022 Grand Prix de France. They finished seventh of seven teams at the event.

Programs

With Piegad

With Hamon

Competitive highlights 
GP: Grand Prix; CS: Challenger Series; JGP: Junior Grand Prix

Pairs with Piegad for France

Pairs with Hamon for France

Men's singles for Ukraine

References

External links 
 

1999 births
French male pair skaters
Living people
Sportspeople from Simferopol
Ukrainian emigrants to France
Ukrainian male single skaters